Elouise Westbrook (1915-2011) was an American housing rights and health activist in San Francisco. She was one of five activists that made up the Big Five of Bayview.

Life and career
Westbrook was born in Gatesville, Texas in 1915. She moved to San Francisco in 1949 where she worked as a supervisor at the city's Economic Opportunity Council. After San Francisco embarked on a large-scale redevelopment plan in 1959, thousands of low-income residents were displaced and no new affordable housing was constructed. Westbrook joined the Hunters Point-Bayview Joint Housing Committee to petition the government to include affordable housing. She soon replaced activist Ruth Williams as head of the committee. In 1968, the committee petitioned the United States Department of Housing and Urban Development for funds to build new low-income and middle-income housing in the Bay Area. Due to the efforts of Westbrook and the other Big Five of Bayview, the Hunters Point neighborhood project was allotted $40 million in funding in 1971. In 1973, she testified in front of the Subcommittee on Housing and Urban Affairs of the United States Senate Committee on Banking, Housing, and Urban Affairs. Throughout the early 1970s, Westbrook lobbied the city of San Francisco to open a free medical clinic in Potrero Hill. The Caleb G. Clark Potrero Hill Health Center opened in 1976.

Death and legacy
She died in her home on September 13, 2011. She was interred next to her husband at the Golden Gate National Cemetery. At her funeral on September 21, 2011, she was eulogized by Mayor Ed Lee and former mayor Willie Brown, who said "she used to scare me" by demanding he answer her calls and showing up at his office unannounced. Actor Danny Glover, who worked with Westbrook as part of the Model Cities Program, also spoke at her funeral.

The Westbrook Plaza Health Center And Housing Complex, which opened three months before her death, is named for Westbrook. San Francisco author William Delaney, one of the first African-American police officers in San Francisco, dedicated his 2011 autobiography to her. In 2007, director Kevin Gordon released a documentary short about her life titled "Tellin' It Like It Is: The Work of Elouise Westbrook".

Personal life
She was married to Isaac Westbrook, a private in the United States Army during World War II. The couple remained married until his death in 1965. Elouise also has a big loving family scattered across the U.S. Even some still in Gatesville, Texas where she was born.

References

External links
1969 KRON-TV documentary featuring Westbrook

People from Gatesville, Texas
People from San Francisco
1915 births
2011 deaths
American housing activists
African-American activists
American health activists
21st-century African-American people
Bayview–Hunters Point, San Francisco